Cropley is a surname. Notable people with the surname include:

Alex Cropley (born 1951), Scottish footballer
Charles Elmore Cropley (1894–1952), Clerk of the Supreme Court of the United States
Jack Cropley, Scottish footballer
John Cropley (disambiguation), multiple people